De Smet Jesuit High School is a Catholic, college preparatory high school for boys located in Creve Coeur, Missouri, in the Roman Catholic Archdiocese of Saint Louis.

The school began classes in the fall of 1967. It was named in honor of the prominent Belgian Jesuit Great Plains missionary Pierre-Jean De Smet.

Academics
Honors courses are offered in math, English, foreign language, social studies, fine arts, and science, totaling 130 college credit hours. Honors students average a score of 31 on the ACT, and grades for honors courses are weighted when calculating grade-point average. The entire curriculum is college prep, but there is a full-service learning center to assist students needing extra help. All students lease a tablet PC, featuring a pen and multi-touch display as well as speech/audio recognition. Moodle is used to facilitate teacher communication with students and parents.

De Smet Jesuit facilities include a 353-seat performing arts theater.

Athletics
De Smet Jesuit fields 53 teams in 19 sports, four of them non-cut. De Smet Jesuit competes in the large school division in the Missouri State High School Activities Association and has won 52 state championships: basketball five times (1973, 1978, 1979, 1982, 1999), soccer six times (1991, 1993, 1995, 1997, 2011, 2019), golf five times (1983, 1985, 1986, 2003, 2021), hockey 14 times, tennis twice (1986, 1987), football twice (2005, 2019), baseball twice (2000, 2019), swimming and diving once (2002), cross country once (1983), and water polo once (2010). The school competes in the Metro Catholic Conference along with fellow private schools Chaminade College Preparatory, Christian Brothers College High School, St. Louis University High School, and St. John Vianney High School. De Smet Jesuit has won the MCC All-Sports Trophy 11 times in the 21-year existence of the conference.

Basketball 
Three of De Smet Jesuit's five state basketball championships came under coach Rich Grawer, who went on to coach at University of Missouri and St. Louis University. His 1979 team went undefeated, 32–0. His teams also established the current Missouri state large-school record for winning streaks at 63 games.

Football 
The Spartans won the 2005 Missouri Class 6 State Championship under head coach Patrick Mahoney and now have won the 2019 Missouri Class 6 State Championship under current head coach, former Dallas Cowboys and Minnesota Vikings and Class of 2008 alumnus Robert Steeples. Recent notable athletes at De Smet Jesuit include Ray Agnew, Robert Steeples, and KeVonn Mabon,

Soccer 
The soccer program has captured six state titles, four of which occurred during seven years during the 1990s, winning championships in alternating years: 1991, 1993, 1995, and 1997. The fifth came in 2011. Longtime head coach Greg Vitello led the program from 1969 to 2014. He is the third-winningest high school coach in United States history. During his time at De Smet, Vitello won five state championships and 33 district championships, and paved the way for five young men to compete on the US national team. Notable players under Vitello included 1987 National Gatorade player of the year Brian Donnelly; 1998 Parade Magazine Soccer Player of the Year Bill McKeon; his brother Matt McKeon, the 1991 Gatorade Circle of Champions Soccer Player of the Year and the 1995 National Collegiate Player of the Year; Chris Klein, the 1993 St. Louis Post-Dispatch Player of the Year; Pat Noonan, the 1997 St. Louis Post-Dispatch Player of the Year; Mike Ambersley, a 2000 Parade Magazine All American and Missouri Player of the Year; and Will Bruin, a 2008 Parade Magazine All-American, a three-time Missouri State High School Soccer Coaches Association Player of the Year, the 2007 Gatorade Missouri Player of the Year and the 2007 Post-Dispatch Player of the Year. Vitello stepped down in 2014, which vaulted Class of 1997 alum Josh Klein to the head coaching position.

Campus ministry
A student Core Team, composed of juniors and seniors who meet during homeroom, is vitally involved in invigorating all aspects of the Campus Ministry program. Students are, further, encouraged to write prayers for the opening and closing of the school day and reflections for the Friday Holy Hour, and plan liturgies; they also network with youth groups at other schools and parishes.

Retreat program
All freshmen make the El Camino retreat in which they come to see life as a journey, with role models, heroes, and acceptance of oneself. It is led by seniors and includes team-building exercises, small-group discussions, and faith sharing. The Kairos retreat runs three days and is led by seniors who have made it. It emphasizes peer leadership and ministry to build solidarity, based on the experience of God's love in our lives. Follow-up gatherings are held for those attending the retreat. The senior retreat lasts two full days and introduces retreatants to various methods of prayer from St. Ignatius’ Spiritual Exercises, directed toward a facility at finding God in all things.

Service program
Freshmen serve the school community at school events. Sophomores assist at school and are also encouraged to volunteer in their neighborhood and church communities. Juniors select from more than 120 area service agencies; they go out on Mondays and their experiences are incorporated into class on Tuesdays. Many are drawn to tutoring children or recreating with them, at inner-city grade schools, homeless shelters, and in Head Start programs; they also work with children having learning disabilities, physical disabilities, autism, or behavioral disorders. The elderly in nursing homes offer a mutually enriching experience for many. Seniors continue on and deepen their experience from junior year. There have also been service-learning trips to Honduras, Belize, South Dakota, and New Orleans, to learn and grow by working with those in need.

The school uses graduates of Jesuit schools as Alum Service Corps volunteers and 17 of these have become full-time teachers at De Smet Jesuit.

Liturgies and spirituality
Mass is celebrated daily at 8:00 am. Each Friday there is a Holy Hour along with the Sacrament of Reconciliation. Ten large Eucharistic celebrations are held throughout the year, incorporating Holy Days or special events like Mass of the Holy Spirit, Missioning, Thanksgiving, Fr. De Smet's birthday, family Masses with BBQ or breakfast, Ring Mass, and graduation.

A Christian Life Community group meets weekly for prayer and reflection, focused on Ignatius’ Spiritual Exercises and on finding God in one's daily life. De Smet in Prayer (DIP) has a breakfast meeting before school once each week to discuss, reflect, and pray together on living out one's faith as brothers in the Lord.

In 2016, three De Smet Jesuit students won the North American sector of the St. Francis Xavier Global Instagram Competition whose purpose was "to convey a message of hope, zeal, sustainability, diversity and belonging to a global community."

Notable alumni

Athletics 
 Ray Agnew III – former NFL player and pro scout for the New York Jets
 Blake Ahearn – assistant coach for the Memphis Grizzlies of the National Basketball Association (NBA)
 Mike Ambersley – MLS forward
 Sam Bick – played for US national soccer team
 Will Bruin – Major League Soccer forward for Seattle Sounders FC
 Eric Delabar – professional soccer player, manager of Maryville University's men's and women's teams
 Trent Frederic – Boston Bruins hockey player, Big 10 Freshman of the Year at the University of Wisconsin, 2016 first-round draft pick
 Steve Fuchs – played for US national soccer team
 Bob Keppel – Major League Baseball pitcher
 Chris Klein - president of Los Angeles Galaxy and MLS midfielder
 KeVonn Mabon – wide receiver for Tennessee Titans
 Matt McKeon – played for US National and Olympic soccer team, MLS midfielder, Hermann Trophy recipient
 Bill Mueller – MLB third baseman, 2003 American League batting champion
 Pat Noonan – assistant coach for US National Soccer Team and Los Angeles Galaxy,  former Major League Soccer forward
 Tony Vitello – University of Tennessee baseball head coach

Government 
 Henry Autrey – United States federal judge, Eastern District of Missouri, also the first graduate from the first graduating class of 1971
 Tom Dempsey – Missouri state senator
 John Diehl – Former Speaker of the Missouri House of Representatives
 Bob Poe – Former Director of International Trade and Commissioner of Administration for the state of Alaska.  Became the President and CEO of the Anchorage Economic Development Corporation in 2004.  In 2010, Poe became the first man in the history of Alaska to run for governor as a Democrat.
 Eric Schmitt – Current United States Senator / Missouri state treasurer/ Missouri Attorney General.

References

External links
 

Roman Catholic Archdiocese of St. Louis
Boys' schools in the United States
Educational institutions established in 1967
Jesuit high schools in the United States
Roman Catholic secondary schools in St. Louis County, Missouri
1967 establishments in Missouri
Buildings and structures in St. Louis County, Missouri